Echague, officially the Municipality of Echague,  is a 1st class municipality in the province of Isabela, Philippines. According to the 2020 census, it has a population of 88,410 people. The town is known for the indigenous and endangered Yogad language, which is spoken and conserved by its locals.

Etymology
Fr. Pedro Salgado, the Dominican writer, in volume I of his "Cagayan Valley and Eastern Cordillera (1581-1898)," wrote that Echague formerly used to be called Camarag, the name of a big tree then common in the place. Before it separated from Nueva Vizcaya, Camarag was Nueva Vizcaya's first capital, before Bayombong was declared such in 1865.

History
The town was founded in 1752 and ecclesiastically placed under the patronage of St. Joseph on May 12, 1753.

Prior to 1856, there were only two provinces in the Cagayan Valley Region: Cagayan and Nueva Vizcaya. The province of Cagayan at that time consisted of all towns from Tumauini to the north in Aparri and all other towns from Ilagan southward to Aritao comprised the Province of Nueva Vizcaya. In order to facilitate the work of the missionaries in the evangelization of the Cagayan Valley, a royal decree was issued on May 1, 1856, that created the Province of Isabela consisting of the towns of Gamu, Angadanan, Bindang (now Roxas) and Camarag (now Echague), Carig (now Santiago City) and Palanan. The new province was named in honor of Queen Isabela II of Spain.

Missionaries wanted to transfer the town from the banks of the Cagayan River to the Ganano River 10 kilometers away. The people rebelled because the soil was more fertile along the Cagayan River. But in 1776, they were forcibly transferred. Some 72 years later, the people returned to Camarag, later renamed after Rafael de Echagüe y Bermingham, a former Spanish governor-general.

Cityhood

House Bill 5970 was filed last January 2020 for the conversion of the municipality of Echague into a component city in the province of Isabela. The bill is currently pending with the committee on local government since January 21, 2020. On February 23, 2021, as introduced by Senator Imee Marcos, Senate Bill 2067 was filed in the Senate with pending status in the committee on February 24, 2021.

Geography

Barangays
Echague is politically subdivided into 64 barangays. These barangays are headed by elected officials: Barangay Captain, Barangay Council, whose members are called Barangay Councilors. All are elected every three years.

Climate

Demographics

Economy

Government

Local government
The municipality is governed by a mayor designated as its local chief executive and by a municipal council as its legislative body in accordance with the Local Government Code. The mayor, vice mayor, and the councilors are elected directly by the people through an election which is being held every three years.

Elected officials

Congress representation
Echague, belonging to the sixth legislative district of the province of Isabela, currently represented by Hon. Faustino A. Dy V.

Education

The Schools Division of Isabela governs the town's public education system. The division office is a field office of the DepEd in Cagayan Valley region. The office governs the public and private elementary and public and private high schools throughout the municipality.

Main elementary schools

Forest Region elementary schools

Main secondary schools

Universities
Isabela State University (Main Campus)

References

External links
Municipal Profile at the National Competitiveness Council of the Philippines 
Echague at the Isabela Government Website 
Local Governance Performance Management System
[ Philippine Standard Geographic Code]
Philippine Census Information
Municipality of Echague

Municipalities of Isabela (province)
Populated places on the Rio Grande de Cagayan